Kowleh (also Romanized as Kaūleh, Kooleh, and Kūleh; also known as Qaula) is a village in Kowleh Rural District, Saral District, Divandarreh County, Kurdistan Province, Iran. At the 2006 census, its population was 309, in 76 families. The village is populated by Kurds.

References 

Towns and villages in Divandarreh County
Kurdish settlements in Kurdistan Province